The 2019 Texas Bowl was a college football bowl game played on December 27, 2019, with kickoff at 6:45 p.m. EST (5:45 p.m. local CDT) on ESPN. It was the 14th edition of the Texas Bowl, and was one of the 2019–20 bowl games concluding the 2019 FBS football season. Sponsored by the Academy Sports + Outdoors sporting goods company, the game was officially known as the Academy Sports + Outdoors Texas Bowl.

Teams
The game was played between the Oklahoma State Cowboys from the Big 12 Conference and the Texas A&M Aggies from the Southeastern Conference (SEC).  This was the 28th overall meeting between Oklahoma State and Texas A&M; Texas A&M leads the all-time series, 17–10. Both Oklahoma State and Texas A&M were charter members of the Big 12, playing in the conference from 1996 until 2012, when Texas A&M left the Big 12 to join the SEC. Oklahoma State entered the bowl with a four-game win streak against Texas A&M.

Oklahoma State Cowboys

Oklahoma State entered the game with an 8–4 record (5–4 in conference) and ranked 25th in the AP Poll. The Cowboys finished in a four-way tie for third place in the Big 12. Oklahoma State was 2–3 against ranked teams.

Texas A&M Aggies

This was Texas A&M's third Texas Bowl, the most appearances of any team. Their 2011 team won that season's Meineke Car Care Bowl of Texas (as the game was then named) over Northwestern, 33–22, and their 2016 team lost that season's Texas Bowl to Kansas State, 33–28. Texas A&M entered the game at 7–5 (4–4 in conference), having finished in fourth place in the SEC's West Division. Texas A&M was 0–5 against ranked teams.

Game summary

Statistics

References

External links
 Game statistics at statbroadcast.com

Texas Bowl
Texas Bowl
Oklahoma State Cowboys football bowl games
Texas A&M Aggies football bowl games
Texas Bowl
Texas Bowl
Texas Bowl